Machan is a 2008 Italian-Sri Lankan comedy film written, directed, and produced by Uberto Pasolini as his directorial debut about the made-up Sri Lankan National Handball Team that vanished in 2004.

Background
Based upon a true story, the film was shot on locations in Sri Lanka and Germany.  The inspiration came from the actual case of the 2004 incident, where a fake Sri Lankan national handball team tricked its way into a German tournament, lost all of their matches, and subsequently vanished. Production spent several weeks speaking with people in the less fortunate areas of Colombo and used the people met through that research to create the backgrounds of the main characters. When director Uberto Pasolini heard of the incident, he stated "I fell in love with the story so much that I decided to shoot it myself". Under the working title of Handball, the film was produced and financed by Redgrave Films (UK), RAI Cinema (Italy), Babelsberg Films (Germany), and Shakthi Films (Sri Lanka), and had its premiere at the Venice Film Festival in August 2008, where it received a 10-minute standing ovation.

After the film completed its rounds of film festivals, it had commercial theatrical debut in Italy in September 2009, and was then picked up by UGC for theatrical distribution in Germany, France, Switzerland, Canada, Belgium, Norway and Sweden, and by Yume Pictures for theatrical release in the United Kingdom October 2009 and DVD distribution April 2010.

Synopsis
Two friends, Manoj (Gihan De Chickera), a bartender, and Stanley (Dharmapriya Dias), a fruit vendor, wish to immigrate to the West to seek their fortune, but have difficulties getting their visa applications approved.  They come across an application to a handball tournament in Bavaria, and not even knowing what the game is, they submit themselves and a group of friends as the "Sri Lanka National Handball Team".  For appearance's sake, they begin minimal training and then seek travel visas from the German Embassy. Manoj leaves the group at the last moment, but the rest fly to Germany. Their plans to simply escape into the West upon arrival in Germany are thwarted by the quick appearance of the tournament organizers and an arena of fans eager to see the powers of the Sri Lanka National Handball Team.

After losing the first matches without any goals, the team finally shoots a goal, which makes them overjoyed. The next morning, the police arrives and searches the hotel, but could not find any trace of the Sri Lankan Handball team. Later, it is shown that each member goes on his own path to various different countries in Europe.

Cast
 Dharmapriya Dias as Stanley, addressed as "Machan"
 Gihan De Chickera as Manoj
 Darshan Dharmaraj as Suresh
 Namal Jayasinghe as Vijith
 Sujeewa Priyalal as Piyal
 Ravi Kumar as Neville
 Saumya Liyanage
 Irangani Serasinghe as Auntie Magie
 Dayadewa Edirisinghe as Naseem
 Sarath Karunaratne as PK
 Mangala Pradeep Kumara as VD
 Mahendra Perera as Ruwan
 Chathurika Pieris as Shalini
 Pradeepan Puwabalasingham as AJ
 Ronika Rannetthi as Esther
 Pitchchei Selvaraj as Nesa
 Jayani Senanayake as Jassmine
 Pubudu Chathuranga
 Sarath Kothalawala
 Lakshman Mendis as Vijitha's father
 Deepani Silva as their spoilt son's mother
 Nino Araliya Jayakody
 Bandula Vithanage as a drunk person
 Seetha Kumari as Manoj's grandmother
 Leonie Kotelawala as Neighbour

Reception
The Sunday Times, rated the film four out of five stars, and wrote "The story was inspired by real-life events, but Pasolini goes all out to turn it into a big-hearted comic drama. Gusto and underlying honesty make it a winner."

The Guardian began their review by writing, "There is more ingenuity, guts and brilliance in the developing world as depicted in Uberto Pasolini's film than anything Hollywood can cobble together."  The reviewer wrote that the film was "one of the most important films to come out of the developing world in recent years", and one of the best films about illegal immigration that he'd seen. He praised the film's sense of "genuine authenticity", in its "rendering the reality of Colombo street life in all its vivid squalor, frustration, humanity and comedy", and noted that Sri Lankans have taken the film "to their hearts and claimed entirely as their own."  Noting the film as being based on an actual event, the reviewer wrote "There had never been a single handball team in the whole country, let alone a national side, and the scam has to go down as one of the most ingenious illegal immigration ploys ever undertaken.

Awards and nominations
 2008, Won FEDIC Award at Venice Film Festival
 2008, Won Label Europa Cinemas Award for Best European film at Venice Film Festival
 2008, Nominated for International Jury Award at São Paulo International Film Festival
 2008, Won Audience Award at Kerala International Film Festival
 2009, Won Audience Award for Best Film at Transilvania International Film Festival
 2009, Won Best Feature Film at Palm Beach International Film Festival
 2009, Won Best Screenplay at Durban International Film Festival
 2009, Won Golden Iris for Best Film at Brussels European Film Festival
 2009, Won RTBF TV Prize for Best Picture at Brussels European Film Festival
 2009, Won Award of the Mayor of the City of Trenčín at Art Film Festival
 2010, Won Best Film of the Year at the Sarasaviya Awards

References

External links
 

2008 films
2000s Sinhala-language films
2000s sports comedy films
Films about immigration
Sri Lankan comedy films
Handball films
Films produced by Prasanna Vithanage
2008 comedy films
Films set in Sri Lanka
Films set in Bavaria
2008 directorial debut films